West Chesterfield is an unincorporated community in the town of Chesterfield in Cheshire County, New Hampshire, United States. It is located north of New Hampshire Route 9 in a valley leading to the Connecticut River.

West Chesterfield has a separate ZIP code (03466) from the rest of Chesterfield.

References

Unincorporated communities in Cheshire County, New Hampshire
Unincorporated communities in New Hampshire
Chesterfield, New Hampshire